The Montana Wing of Civil Air Patrol (CAP) is the highest echelon of Civil Air Patrol in the state of Montana. Montana Wing headquarters are located on Malmstrom Air Force Base in Great Falls, Montana. The Montana Wing consists of roughly 300 cadet and adult members across the state of Montana.

Mission
Established in 1941, Civil Air Patrol is the official auxiliary of the U.S. Air Force and as such is a member of its Total Force. In its auxiliary role, CAP operates a fleet of 560 single-engine Cessna aircraft and more than 2,000 small Unmanned Aircraft Systems (sUAS) and performs about 90% of all search and rescue operations within the contiguous United States as tasked by the Air Force Rescue Coordination Center. Often using innovative cellphone forensics and radar analysis software, CAP was credited by the AFRCC with saving 130 lives during the past fiscal year. CAP’s 54,000 members also perform homeland security, disaster relief and drug interdiction missions at the request of federal, state and local agencies. As a nonprofit organization, CAP plays a leading role in aerospace education using national academic standards-based STEM (science, technology, engineering and math) education. Members also serve as mentors to over 20,000 young people participating in CAP’s Cadet Programs.

Emergency services
Providing emergency services includes performing search and rescue and disaster relief missions; as well as assisting in humanitarian aid assignments. The CAP also provides Air Force support through conducting light transport, communications support, and low-altitude route surveys. Civil Air Patrol can also provide support to counter-drug missions.

Cadet programs
The CAP offers cadet programs for youth aged 12 to 21. Cadets receive training in aerospace education, leadership, physical fitness and moral leadership.

Aerospace education
The CAP offers aerospace education for CAP members as well as the general public. This education is provided by offering training to the cadet members of CAP, and also by offering workshops for youth throughout the nation through schools and public aviation events.

Organization

See also
Awards and decorations of Civil Air Patrol
Fort William Henry Harrison
Malmstrom Air Force Base
Montana Air National Guard

References

External links
Montana Wing Civil Air Patrol official website
Montana Wing Civil Air Patrol Facebook page
Rocky Mountain Region Civil Air Patrol official website

Wings of the Civil Air Patrol
Education in Montana
Military in Montana